Keep is a surname. Notable people with the surname include:

Albert Keep (1826–1907), American railroad financier
Angela Keep (born 1981), Australian actress
Henry Keep (American football) (1872–1965), American football player
Henry Keep (businessman) (1818-1869), American banker and railroader
Henry Keep (politician) (1863–1905), Australian politician
Jason Keep (born 1978), American basketball player
Judith Keep (1944–2004), American judge 
John Keep (1781–1870), American trustee of Oberlin College
Nathan Cooley Keep (1800–1875), American dentistry pioneer 
Robert Porter Keep (1844–1904), American teacher